Pierre Mingand (1900–1982) was a French singer and film actor. He was known for his impersonations of Maurice Chevalier at the Folies Bergère, something he reprised in Billy Wilder's 1934 film Mauvaise Graine.

Selected filmography
 Court Waltzes (1933)
 Mauvaise Graine (1934)
 Mademoiselle Mozart (1935)
 The Secret of Woronzeff (1935)
 The Marriages of Mademoiselle Levy (1936)
 Return at Dawn (1938)
 Abused Confidence (1938)
 Mademoiselle Swing (1942)

References

Bibliography
 Phillips, Alastair. City of Darkness, City of Light: Émigré Filmmakers in Paris, 1929–1939. Amsterdam University Press, 2004.

External links

1900 births
1982 deaths
French male film actors
Actors from Besançon
20th-century French male singers
Musicians from Besançon